The New American University model is a model created by Arizona State University (ASU) 16th President Michael M. Crow to change admissions and teaching methods at American universities in order to widen access to higher education. It was first adopted by the ASU after being implemented in 2014 by the ASU Charter, and was introduced in Crow's 2015 book "Designing the New American University," in which the model was supported by former President Bill Clinton and former Florida Governor Jeb Bush. Crow stated he first conceived of the idea after moving from his position as Provost at Columbia University to ASU because he believed that universities were no longer fulfilling their social obligations in passing on higher education through their own admissions to be more selective. The move is widely credited with boosting ASU's acceptance rate and increasing class size, helping it become one of the largest public universities in the United States by enrollment.

Principles 
The principles of the New American University have been used to develop the ASU charter. The charter states: "ASU is a comprehensive public research university, measured not by whom it excludes, but by whom it includes and how they succeed; advancing research and discovery of public value; and assuming fundamental responsibility for the economic, social, cultural and overall health of the communities it serves." Crow summarizes this as: 

 "An academic platform committed to discovery and knowledge production, as with the standard model, linking pedagogy with research"
 "Broad accessibility to students from highly diverse demographic and socioeconomic backgrounds"
 "Through its breadth of activities and functions, an institutional commitment to maximizing societal impact commensurate with the scale of enrollment demand and the needs of our nation."

Criticism 
The model, though has been criticized for decreasing the value of education, moving many in-person classes to online, and decrease the value of academic positions such as tenure, as tenured professors are often less favored than adjunct and part-time instructors. Inside Higher Ed also criticized that the initiative increases the commercialization and corporatization of education, claiming that "Arizona State is indistinguishable from Amazon."

References

Arizona State University